The FIBA Europe Young Men's Player of the Year Award was an annual Player of the Year (POY) award that was given by FIBA Europe, the European division of FIBA, the international governing body of the sport of basketball, to the best basketball player with European citizenship, aged 22 and under of the year. The inaugural award was given out in the year 2005 to Nikos Zisis of Greece. The vote was decided upon by a panel of basketball experts and also by fan voting. 

The candidates included all European basketball players aged 22 and under in the world, regardless of whether they played in Europe, or anywhere else in the world. Also, the candidates included all players, from both professional sports leagues such as the NBA or the EuroLeague, etc. (including from both senior and junior level sports clubs) and amateur status, such as the NCAA's college basketball competitions, etc. The FIBA Europe Young Men's Player of the Year Award was the junior European Player of the Year award (only for players aged 22 and under) that was given by FIBA, and is not to be confused with the senior men's award, which was the FIBA Europe Men's Player of the Year Award.

The award was a calendar year by calendar year award, and was not a season by season award.

Award winners

See also 
 FIBA Europe Men's Player of the Year Award
 Euroscar
 Mr. Europa
 EuroLeague MVP
 EuroLeague Final Four MVP

References

External links
FIBAEurope.com FIBA Europe Young Men's Player of the Year Award Winners

FIBA Europe
Awards established in 2005
European basketball awards
Awards disestablished in 2014